The men's 10000 metres race of the 2014–15 ISU Speed Skating World Cup 2, arranged in the Taereung International Ice Rink, in Seoul, South Korea, was held on 22 November 2014.

Bob de Jong of the Netherlands won the race, while Bart Swings of Belgium came second, and Aleksandr Rumyantsev of Russia came third. Erik Jan Kooiman of the Netherlands won the Division B race.

Results
The race took place on Saturday, 22 November, with Division B scheduled in the morning session, at 09:00, and Division A scheduled in the afternoon session, from 13:45.

Division A

Division B

References

Men 10000
2